Saurashtra Kutch Stock Exchange Limited, popularly called Stock Exchange, or SKSE) is one of three Indian stock exchange in Gujarat. It is located at Sadar Bazaar, Rajkot, India. Saurashtra Kutch Stock Exchange Ltd was incorporated in July 1989 and got recognition from the Government of India. The recognition have been renewed from time to time by the Central Government and SEBI. It is under the ownership of Ministry of Finance of the Government of India.

History and Present

The Stock Exchange is recognized under the Securities Contracts Regulation Act. Earlier the Stock Exchange was having very good volume. The broker members were doing huge volume on the floor of the stock exchange. Subsequently after the commencement of National Stock Exchange and on-line computerized trading, the volume on the regional Stock Exchanges faced the decreased trend and as a result, the regional stock exchanges were facing difficulties of reduced liquidity, volume and dept. In December 1999, SEBI has permitted the regional stock exchange to acquire membership of bigger stock exchanges like BSE and NSE by forming a subsidiary company and thereby to provide trading platform to the brokers of regional stock exchanges. Accordingly, many stock exchanges have floated subsidiary company for acquiring membership of BSE or NSE. Our stock exchange has also floated a subsidiary company namely SKSE Securities Limited which is a 100% subsidiary of Saurashtra Kutch Stock Exchange Ltd. This subsidiary has acquired membership of BSE and NSE and it has got SEBI registration also and got permission for trading from the Stock Exchange, Mumbai and National Stock Exchange of India Ltd., Mumbai. Our subsidiary is also a Depository Participant of CDSL.

Automation

The stock exchange went live on 3 October 1996. Online trading was inaugurated by Shri M. R. Maiya (Bhishmapitamaha of Capital Market). Initially, SKSE used paperbased system before automation. Since 3 October 1996, SKSE operates on Saurashtra Kutch Stock Exchanges's Online Trading System called SKATE. Members of the SKSE can also trade on the Bombay Stock Exchange though VSAT channels. Today the stock exchange has 120 trading members.

Subsidiary
SKSE Securities Ltd is a subsidiary of Saurashtra Kutch Stock Exchange Ltd. SKSE Securities Ltd is member of The Stock Exchange Ltd, Mumbai (BSE), National Stock Exchange of India (NSE), Central Depository System (India) Ltd (CDSL).
As SKSE securities ltd is a 100% subsidiary of skse ltd, has to follow up the winding process as skse ltd is de-recognized the rights to trade on bse/nse as per the sebi guidelines.

SKSE securities has to give notice to the account holder or traders to stop using the services so as to comply with the sebi order immediately

See also 
 List of stock exchanges
 List of South Asian stock exchanges
 List of stock exchanges in the Commonwealth of Nations

References

External links
 Saurashtra Kutch Stock Exchange Limited

Rajkot
Economy of Gujarat
Former stock exchanges in India
1989 establishments in Gujarat
Indian companies established in 1989